The Carthage Courthouse Square Historic District is a historic district encompassing the courthouse square of Carthage, Hancock County, Illinois. The district includes 52 buildings, 42 of which are considered contributing to the district's historic character. The 1908 Hancock County Courthouse, a three-story limestone Beaux-Arts building, is the centerpiece of the district. The courthouse is surrounded by commercial buildings, most of them built in the latter half of the nineteenth century. Architect George Payne designed many of the district's commercial buildings, giving him a reputation which spread beyond Carthage; his works include Italianate and Romanesque Revival designs.

The district was added to the National Register of Historic Places on August 13, 1986.

References

Italianate architecture in Illinois
Romanesque Revival architecture in Illinois
Beaux-Arts architecture in Illinois
National Register of Historic Places in Hancock County, Illinois
Historic districts on the National Register of Historic Places in Illinois
Courthouses on the National Register of Historic Places in Illinois